Midland School may refer to;

Midland School, Los Olivos, California
Midland School, North Branch, New Jersey

See also
Midland High School (disambiguation)